The 1910 Auburn Tigers football team represented Alabama Polytechnic Institute (now known Auburn University) as a member of the Southern Intercollegiate Athletic Association (SIAA) during the 1910 college football season. The team was led by head coach Mike Donahue, in his sixth year, and played their home games at both the Drill Field in Auburn, Alabama. They finished the season with a record of six wins and one loss, and finished as SIAA co-champion. The team's leading scorer was Bill Streit.

Schedule

References

Auburn
Auburn Tigers football seasons
Auburn Tigers football